Karl or Carl May may refer to:

 Karl May, German novelist, writer, musician, and teacher
Karl May (film), film about the writer
15728 Karlmay, asteroid named after the writer
 Karl May School, Saint Petersburg, Russia
Karl Ivanovich May, Russian educator and namesake of Karl May School
Carl May, sociologist

See also
Carl Mays, baseball player